South Korea's Ministry of Employment and Labor (MOEL) is a cabinet-level ministry overseeing labor affairs. Its predecessor agency, the Division of Labor, was established under the direction of the Minister of Social Affairs (사회부장관) on 11 November 1948. It was upgraded to a cabinet ministry on 8 April 1981.

The headquarters are located in Building #11 of the Sejong Government Complex in Sejong City. Previously the headquarters were located in Buildings 1 and 3 of the Government Complex II in Gwacheon, Gyeonggi Province.

Work 
Major tasks include the establishment of policies related to employment, establishment and management of policies related to industrial insurance, the establishment and management of policies related to industrial insurance, the establishment of policies related to occupational capacity development, employment equality with work and family compatibility, and the establishment of policies related to labor conditions.

References

External links

Ministry of Employment and Labor
Ministry of Employment and Labor 
Ministry of Labor (Archive)
Ministry of Labor  (Archive)

Labor in South Korea
South Korea
Government ministries of South Korea
Government agencies established in 1948